Edgar Clarence Ellis (October 2, 1854 – March 15, 1947) was a U.S. Representative from Missouri.

Early life
Edgar Clarence Ellis was born on October 2, 1854, in Vermontville, Michigan. Ellis attended country schools. He graduated from Olivet College in Michigan in 1880 with a Bachelor of Arts, and graduated from Carleton College, Northfield, Minnesota, in 1881.

Ellis worked as an instructor in Latin at Carleton College in 1881 and 1882. He worked as superintendent of public schools at Fergus Falls, Minnesota from 1882 to 1885. He studied law. He was admitted to the bar and commenced practice in Beloit, Kansas, in 1885.

Career
Ellis moved to Kansas City, Missouri, in 1888 and continued the practice of his profession. In 1893, Ellis joined up with Hale C. Cook under the law firm Ellis & Cook. James A. Reed and Ernest Ellis would later join, and the firm became Ellis, Cook & Ellis.

Ellis was elected as a Republican to the Fifty-ninth and Sixtieth Congresses (March 4, 1905 – March 3, 1909). He was an unsuccessful candidate for reelection in 1908 to the Sixty-first Congress. He resumed the practice of law in Kansas City, Missouri. He was appointed a member of the Missouri Waterway Commission and served in 1911 and 1912.

Ellis was elected to the Sixty-seventh Congress (March 4, 1921 – March 3, 1923). He was an unsuccessful candidate for reelection in 1922 to the Sixty-eighth Congress. Ellis was elected to the Sixty-ninth Congress (March 4, 1925 – March 3, 1927). He was an unsuccessful candidate for reelection in 1926 to the Seventieth Congress. Ellis was elected to the Seventy-first Congress (March 4, 1929 – March 3, 1931). He was an unsuccessful candidate for reelection in 1930 to the Seventy-second Congress. He then retired from law practice and political life.

Personal life
While a school principal at Fergus Falls, he married Emily Hatch Roy, daughter of abolitionists Rev. Joseph Edwin Roy and Emily Stearns Hatch Roy, on July 20, 1882, in Atlanta, Georgia. They had three sons. His wife died in 1931. He married Mrs. Katherine Morgan of Cincinnati in 1936.

Ellis died in St. Petersburg, Florida, on March 15, 1947. His remains were cremated and the ashes interred in Kansas City, Missouri.

References

External links

1854 births
1947 deaths
American Congregationalists
Carleton College alumni
Carleton College faculty
People from Fergus Falls, Minnesota
Republican Party members of the United States House of Representatives from Missouri
Politicians from Kansas City, Missouri